The 1926 Allan Cup was the Canadian senior ice hockey championship for the 1925–26 season.

Final 
Port Arthur 1 University of Toronto 0
University of Toronto 3 Port Arthur 1
University of Toronto 3 Port Arthur 3
Port Arthur 3 University of Toronto 2

Port Arthur Bearcats beat University of Toronto 2-1, 1 tie on series.

External links
Allan Cup archives 
Allan Cup website

 
Allan Cup
Allan Cup